Verkhnetsimlyansky is a rural locality (a khutor) in Krasnoyarskoye Rural Settlement, Chernyshkovsky District, Volgograd Oblast, Russia. The population was 19 as of 2010.

Geography 
Verkhnetsimlyansky is located 31 km northeast of Chernyshkovsky (the district's administrative centre) by road. Maloternovoy is the nearest rural locality.

References 

Rural localities in Chernyshkovsky District